The Day After is a 2017 South Korean drama film written, produced, directed and scored by Hong Sang-soo. It was selected to compete for the Palme d'Or in the main competition section at the 2017 Cannes Film Festival.

Cast
 Kwon Hae-hyo as Kim Bong-wan 
 Kim Min-hee as Song Ah-reum
 Kim Sae-byuk as Lee Chang-sook 
 Jo Yoon-hee as Song Hae-joo

Reception
On Rotten Tomatoes, the film has an approval rating of 79%, based on reviews from 39 critics, with an average rating of 7.32/10. The website's critical consensus reads, "The Day After may rank among the slighter works in writer-director Hong Sang-soo's filmography, yet it still presents an absorbingly earnest look at relationships in turmoil." On Metacritic, the film has an average score of 72 out of 100, based on fourteen critics, indicating "generally favorable reviews".

Awards

References

External links
 
 
 
 
 

2017 films
2017 drama films
South Korean drama films
South Korean black-and-white films
2010s Korean-language films
Adultery in films
Films directed by Hong Sang-soo
Works about book publishing and bookselling
2010s South Korean films